C/2017 T1 (Heinze) is a near parabolic comet that passed closest to Earth on January 4, 2018, at a distance of 0.22 AU. It was discovered on 10/2/2017 by Ari Heinze of the University of Hawaiʻi. Perihelion is on February 21, 2018, and it is expected peak magnitude about 8.8.

References

 
 MPEC 2017-U15 : COMET C/2017 T1 (Heinze) MinorPlanetCenter

Comets in 2018
Cometary object articles
Non-periodic comets
20171002